Steve Jobs is the authorized self-titled biography of American business magnate and Apple co-founder Steve Jobs. The book was written at the request of Jobs by Walter Isaacson, a former executive at CNN and TIME who had previously written best-selling biographies of Benjamin Franklin and Albert Einstein.

Based on more than forty interviews with Jobs conducted over two years—in addition to interviews with more than one hundred family members, friends, adversaries, competitors, and colleagues—Isaacson was given "unprecedented" access to Jobs's life. Jobs is said to have encouraged the people interviewed to speak honestly. Although Jobs cooperated with the book, he asked for no control over its content other than the book's cover, and waived the right to read it before it was published.
Describing his writing, Issacson commented that he had striven to take a balanced view of his subject that did not sugarcoat Jobs's flaws.

The book was released on October 24, 2011, by Simon & Schuster in the United States, 19 days after Jobs's death.

A film adaptation written by Aaron Sorkin and directed by Danny Boyle, with Michael Fassbender starring in the title role, was released on October 9, 2015.

Appearance

Front cover
The front cover uses a photo of Steve Jobs commissioned by Fortune magazine in 2006 for a portfolio of powerful people. The photograph was taken by Albert Watson.

When the photograph was taken, he said he insisted on having a three-hour period to set up his equipment, adding that he wanted to make "[every shoot] as greased lightning fast as possible for the [subject]." When Jobs arrived he didn't immediately look at Watson, but instead at the equipment, focusing on Watson's 4×5 camera before saying, "wow, you're shooting film."

Jobs gave Watson an hour—longer than he had given most photographers for a portrait session. Watson reportedly instructed Jobs to make "95 percent, almost 100 percent of eye contact with the camera," and to "think about the next project you have on the table," in addition to thinking about instances when people have challenged him.

The title font is Helvetica.

Back cover
The back cover uses another photographic portrait of Jobs taken in his living room in Woodside, California in February 1984 by Norman Seeff. In a Behind the Cover article published by TIME magazine, Seeff recalls him and Jobs "just sitting" on his living room floor, talking about "creativity and everyday stuff," when Jobs left the room and returned with a Macintosh 128K (the original Macintosh computer). Jobs "[plopped] down" in the lotus position holding the computer in his lap when Seeff took the photograph.

Title
The book's working title, iSteve: The Book of Jobs, was chosen by publisher Simon & Schuster's publicity department. Although author Walter Isaacson was "never quite sure about it", his wife and daughter reportedly were. However, they thought it was "too cutesy" and as a result Isaacson persuaded the publisher to change the title to something "simpler and more elegant."

The title Steve Jobs was allegedly chosen to reflect Jobs's "minimalist" style and to emphasize the biography's authenticity, further differentiating it from unauthorized publications, such as iCon Steve Jobs: The Greatest Second Act in the History of Business by Jeffrey Young.

Chapters
Many of the chapters within the book have sub-headings, which are matched in various audiobook versions resulting in listings showing 150+ chapters when there are only 42 chapters. The audiobook contains a mistake on one chapter title, listing Chapter 41 as "Round Three, A Never-ending Struggle" instead of "Round Three, Twilight Struggle" as published.

Reception
Janet Maslin's review of the book for The New York Times mixed mild criticisms with praise. Maslin wrote that Isaacson's biography presented "an encyclopedic survey of all that Mr. Jobs accomplished, replete with the passion and excitement that it deserves."

A number of Steve Jobs's family and close colleagues expressed disapproval, including Laurene Powell Jobs, Tim Cook and Jony Ive. Cook remarked that the biography did Jobs “a tremendous disservice", and that "it didn’t capture the person. The person I read about there is somebody I would never have wanted to work with over all this time.” Ive said of the book that “my contempt couldn’t be lower.”

Commercially, the biography was a notable success, selling more than three million copies in the United States alone by 2015.

Film adaptation

Steve Jobs is a drama film based on the life of Apple co-founder Steve Jobs, starring Michael Fassbender in the title role. The film is directed by Danny Boyle, produced by Scott Rudin, and written by Aaron Sorkin (with a screenplay adapted both from Isaacson's Steve Jobs as well as from interviews conducted by Sorkin).

Other media
Extracts from the biography have been the feature of various magazines, in addition to interviews with the author, Walter Isaacson.

To memorialize Jobs's life after his death on October 5, 2011, TIME published a commemorative issue on October 8, 2011. The issue's cover featured a portrait of Jobs, taken by Norman Seeff, in which he is sitting in the lotus position holding the original Macintosh computer. The portrait was published in Rolling Stone in January 1984 and is featured on the back cover of Steve Jobs. The issue marked the eighth time Jobs has been featured on the cover of Time.
The issue included a photographic essay by Diana Walker, a retrospective on Apple by Harry McCracken and Lev Grossman, and a six-page essay by Walter Isaacson. Isaacson's essay served as a preview of Steve Jobs and described Jobs pitching the book to him.

Bloomberg Businessweek also released a commemorative issue of its magazine remembering the life of Jobs. The cover of the magazine features Apple-like simplicity, with a black-and-white, up-close photo of Jobs and his years of birth and death. In tribute to Jobs's minimalist style, the issue was published without advertisements. It featured extensive essays by Steve Jurvetson, John Sculley, Sean Wisely, William Gibson, and Walter Isaacson. Similarly to Time's commemorative issue, Isaacson's essay served as a preview of Steve Jobs.

Fortune featured an exclusive extract of the biography on October 24, 2011, focusing on the "friend-enemy" relationship Jobs had with Bill Gates.

Awards and honors
Even after a late release that year, the book became Amazon's #1 seller for 2011.

 2012 Financial Times and Goldman Sachs Business Book of the Year Award, shortlist
 2011 The New York Times bestseller
 2011 Christian Science Monitor Best Book, nonfiction
 2011 Time Magazine's Best Books of the Year

See also

2011 in literature
Apple Inc. development history

References

External links
Presentation by Isaacson on Steve Jobs, December 13, 2011, C-SPAN
Presentation by Isaacson on Steve Jobs, September 22, 2012, C-SPAN

2011 non-fiction books
American history books
Books about Steve Jobs
Biographies adapted into films
English-language books
Simon & Schuster books
American biographies